Byeongpungsan is a mountain of Jeollanam-do, western South Korea. It has an elevation of 822 metres.

See also
List of mountains of Korea

References

Mountains of South Jeolla Province
Jangseong County
Damyang County
Mountains of South Korea